Hubbell Incorporated is an American company that designs, manufactures, and sells electrical and electronic products for non-residential and residential construction, industrial, and utility applications. Hubbell was founded by Harvey Hubbell as a proprietorship in 1888, and was incorporated in Connecticut in 1905. It is ranked 602 by Fortune. The company’s reporting segments consist of the electrical segment (comprising electrical systems products and lighting products) and the Power segment. Hubbell’s manufacturing facilities are located in the United States, Canada, Switzerland, Puerto Rico, Mexico, the People's Republic of China ("China"), Italy, the United Kingdom, Brazil and Australia and maintains sales offices in Singapore, China, India, Mexico, South Korea, and countries in the Middle East. 
Hubbell was previously headquartered in Orange, Connecticut, and has now moved its headquarters to Shelton, Connecticut.
Hubbell Inc. assisted Allied efforts during World War II by manufacturing military vehicle electrical circuits, battery-charging systems for M4 Sherman tanks, power jacks for test meters, vacuum tube sockets for radio communications, and a line of electrical and electronic connectors for aircraft. Hubbell Inc. is in List of S&P 400 companies having stocks that are included in the S&P 400 stock market index, maintained by S&P Dow Jones Indices.

History 

Hubbell Incorporated was founded as a proprietorship in 1888 by Harvey Hubbell II. Born in Connecticut in 1857, he was a U.S. inventor,  entrepreneur, and industrialist. His best-known inventions are the U.S. electrical plug and the pull-chain light socket. He graduated from high school and began working for companies that manufactured marine engines and printing machinery. During this time, he accumulated several ideas for new inventions, and in 1888 he set out on his own, opening a small manufacturing facility in Bridgeport, Connecticut. Hubbell's first product was taken from his own patent for a paper roll holder with a toothed blade for use in stores that sold wrapping paper. This cutter stand became a tremendous success; it was a common feature of retail stores that used wrapping paper in the early 1900s and remained in wide use into the late 20th century.

Soon he discovered that he had to design machinery to make its parts. One of the first was a tapping machine, also his patent. Around 1896 with his business in machinery progressing, Hubbell's next patent was a major breakthrough in the fastener industry: the process and machinery for cold rolled screw threads which reduced the rate of material lost in production by more than 50%. He designed and built progressive blanking and forming dies, patented machinery to slot screw heads, a machine to assemble screws and small parts, devised tools to indicate speed, and patented a changeable speed screwdriver. Hubbell's idea was to provide convenience, safety, and control to an electric light with his new "pull socket" which was patented in August 1896. The same familiar device with its on/off pull chain is still in use today. 
He built three prototypes by hand using metal and insulated wood parts to design a product with individual wires permanently attached in the proper sequence and correct polarity, and one which could be connected or disconnected, easily and safely, to a power supply in the wall. cartridge fuses and fuse block, lamp holders, key sockets - soon followed the same path Later, Hubbell's "separable plug" design took shape on the drawing board back in Bridgeport, and then submitted to the patent office in Washington, D.C. Additional designs based on that basic concept - separable plugs in different configurations, a single flush mounted receptacle - as well as new products for electrical circuits. One of the most successful and the one most familiar today, was the duplex receptacle which is still found everywhere that electrical power is used.
 
In 1901 Hubbell published a 12-page catalogue that listed 63 electrical products of his company's manufacture, and four years later he incorporated his enterprise as Harvey Hubbell, Incorporated , In the same year, the company registered its trademark of "...a sphere with meridian lines and the name 'Hubbell' centered within." Hubbell's pace of new ideas and product design did not falter. In 1909 the company began constructing a four-floor factory and office building that would become the first building in New England made of reinforced concrete.

Between 1896 and 1909 he was granted 45 patents on a wide variety of electrical products company's product lines had been continuously expanded. Catalogue #17 was published in March 1917 . The catalogue had more than 100 pages and listed more than a thousand products. In bulb sockets alone, the company manufactured 277 different types and sizes. Hubbell's toggle action light switch which incorporated a "quick make or break" feature to meet the rigid requirements of Underwriters' Laboratories (UL) was replacing the former two button type push switch . Hubbell designed a "Loxin" mechanism which fit into any standard socket and locked the bulb in place. Falling lightbulbs no longer endangered streetcar passengers, and overly thrifty commuters had to find a new source of replacement bulbs for home use. For the home, the company developed a system for lighting fixture connections called "Elexit" which allowed the homeowner to install most fixtures without hiring an electrician.

Company's first era ended when its founder Harvey Hubbell II died on December 17, 1927. He was succeeded as president of the company by his son, Harvey Hubbell III. Twenty-six years old when he succeeded his father, Harvey Hubbell III had already spent years working in the business. That early experience with electrical equipment engineering and learning the discipline of production was to stand the company in good stead in the decades to come.

Harvey Hubbell III soon showed that he had inherited his father's twin acumen for product innovation and business development. In product innovation, he devised the company's lines of Twist-Lock industrial connectors with new 2-,3-,and 4-wire devices of various ratings, designed a whole new series of locking connectors for industrial use which he named "Hubbellock", and introduced heavy-duty, circuit-breaking devices. The company played a large part in the war effort by meeting the demand for electrical components and systems to power the nation's industries and by developing products for the special applications needed by military. These included components for military vehicle electrical circuits, battery-charging systems for M-4 tanks, power jacks for test meters, vacuum tube sockets for radio communications, and a line of electrical and electronic connectors for aircraft. The company's years of experience in building devices reliable enough for industrial use was a valuable asset in the production of products which could perform under rugged battlefield conditions. A second plant was opened in Lexington, Kentucky, in order to meet the demand and as a safety measure since the main plant in Bridgeport was considered vulnerable to air or sea attack.

Hubbell had been one of the first to manufacture flush toggle switches for alternating current only. The first Safety Receptacle was designed and produced as were the original "grounding only" devices which helped to set the standards for the industry. And while Hubbell was busy on land, the company found new opportunities at sea. In 1952, the ocean liner "SS United States" was launched in Newport News, Virginia. Queen of the seas for many years, the ship was completely fitted with Hubbell wiring devices designed expressly for narrow stateroom partitions and to withstand the effects of salt air. An ardent yachtsman himself, Harvey Hubbell III designed a complete family of corrosion resistant devices including both on-board and dockside equipment for the expanding pleasure boat industry. Familiar sights at marinas today, these first products were so successful that alternative designs were produced for many industrial applications where corrosive atmospheres and materials posed challenges for standard wiring devices.

The company's sales in new products and continuing lines increased proportionately to these successes, but more was to come as Harvey Hubbell, Incorporated added diversification. Beginning in 1960, the company entered a new period of rapidly expanding growth in both sales and income. Much of the growth resulted from the company's internal product development, a longstanding Hubbell tradition, and a source which expanded under the industry leadership of Harvey Hubbell III and other Hubbell engineers. A second source of growth through acquisition. 1960 onwards to till now Hubbell Incorporated has acquired many brands working for power, electric, lighting sectors. Hubbell Incorporated has grown to be an international manufacturer of electrical and electronic products for a broad range of non-residential and residential construction, industrial, and utility applications

Acquisitions 

In addition to its growth in both sales and income from the product development, a second source of growth is through acquisition.

Business line 
Hubbell designs, manufactures, and sells various product under three major sections which are Electrical systems, Lighting Products, and Power Segment. Some of the major products are as follows.

References

Manufacturing companies based in Connecticut
Companies based in Fairfield County, Connecticut
Shelton, Connecticut
Electrical equipment manufacturers
Electronics companies of the United States
Electronics companies established in 1888
1888 establishments in Connecticut
Companies listed on the New York Stock Exchange